Engollan is a hamlet  south-west of Padstow in Cornwall, England. Engollan is in the civil parish of St Eval.

References

Views of Engollan 

Hamlets in Cornwall